Galatasaray Community is the organization of Galatasaray institutions which were derived from Galatasaray High School, which cooperate under the one umbrella. It was established on 11 October 1988, when the organization was created under the protocol purposes and internal regulations were published on this date. Board meetings are held every two months.

Domestic and international alumni associations, and Galatasaray High School, Galatasaray University, Galatasaray Sports Club, Galatasaray Educational Foundation, Galatasaray Mutual Assistance Foundation, and Galatasaray Primary School form the Galatasaray Community Cooperation Committee, which consists of 24 organizations.

Organizations

External links
 Galatasaray Community Official Website
 Galatasaray High School
 Galatasaray Sports Club
 Galatasaray University
 Galatasaray Primary School

Galatasaray S.K.
Organizations established in 1988
Organizations based in Istanbul